Geothermal energy was first used for electric power production in the United States in 1960. The Geysers in Sonoma and Lake counties, California was developed into the largest geothermal steam electrical plant in the world, at 1,517 megawatts. Other geothermal steam fields operate in the western US and Alaska.

Geothermal power can be dispatchable to follow the demands of changing loads.

Its environmental impact includes hydrogen sulfide emissions, corrosive or saline chemicals discharged in waste water, possible seismic effects from injection into rock formations, waste heat and noise.

History

Archaeological evidence documents that geothermal resources have been in use in the US for more than 10,000 years. Paleo-Indians first used geothermal hot springs for warmth, cleansing, and minerals.

Pacific Gas and Electric opened the US' first commercial geothermal power plant at The Geysers in California in September 1960, initially producing eleven megawatts of net power. The Geysers system grew into the world's largest, with an output of 750 MW. The original turbine lasted for more than 30 years.

Near Several small power plants were built during the late 1980s in the Basin and Range geologic province in Nevada, southeastern Oregon, southwestern Idaho, Arizona and western Utah. is now an area of rapid geothermal development.

In the Salton Sea, as of 2001, 15 geothermal plants were producing electricity. Hudson Ranch I geothermal plant, a 50 MW plant opened in May 2012. A second similar plant was to open in 2013.
The most significant development catalyst is the Energy Policy Act of 2005. This Act made new geothermal plants eligible for the full federal production tax credit, previously available only to wind power projects and certain kinds of biomass. It also authorized and directed increased funding for research by the Department of Energy, and enabled the Bureau of Land Management to address its backlog of geothermal leases and permits.

In April 2008, exploratory drilling began at Newberry Volcano in Oregon. As of August 2008, 103 new projects were under way in 13 US states. When developed, these projects could potentially supply up to 3,979 MW of power, meeting the needs of about 4 million homes. The DOE Geothermal Technologies Program (part of the American Recovery and Reinvestment Act of 2009) allowed the USDOE to fund research in Enhanced Geothermal Systems (EGS) to learn more about the fracture systems in geothermal reservoirs and better predict the results of reservoir stimulation.

In 2009, investment bank Credit Suisse calculated that geothermal power costs 3.6 cents per kilowatt-hour, versus 5.5 cents per kilowatt-hour for coal, if geothermal receives subsidized loans.

A report released in late May 2019 by the Department of Energy suggests that US geothermal power capacity could increase by more than twenty-six times by 2050, reaching a capacity of 60 GW, thanks to accelerated technological development and adoption. The report documented the benefits of geothermal power for residential and industrial heating. Energy Secretary Rick Perry announced his Department had provided funding for a $140-million research facility at the University of Utah on man-made geothermal energy.

In 2018, due to volcanic activity the Puna Geothermal Venture in Hawaii had to be closed and was inundated by lava flows. It reopened in November 2020.

Production

With 3,676 MW of installed geothermal capacity as of 2019, the US remains the world leader with about 25% of the online capacity total. The future outlook for expanded production from conventional and enhanced geothermal systems is positive as new technologies promise increased growth in locations previously not considered.

By state
Installed geothermal capacity in megawatts (MW) by state as of February 2012:

Geysers 
The Geysers has 1517 megawatt (MW) of active installed capacity with an average capacity factor of 63%. Calpine Corporation owns 15 of the 18 active plants in the Geysers and is the US' largest producer of geothermal energy. Two other plants are owned jointly by the Northern California Power Agency and Silicon Valley Power. The remaining Bottle Rock Power Plant is owned by the US Renewables Group. A nineteenth plant is under development by Ram Power. The Geysers is recharged by injecting treated sewage effluent from the City of Santa Rosa and the Lake County sewage treatment plant. This effluent used to be dumped into rivers and streams and is now piped to the geothermal field where it replenishes the steam produced for power generation.

Salton Sea 
Another major geothermal area is located in south central California, on the southeast side of the Salton Sea, near Niland and Calipatria, California. 15 geothermal plants combine for  a capacity of about 570 MW. CalEnergy owns about half of them and the rest are owned by various companies.

Basin and Range 
The Basin and Range geologic province in Nevada, southeastern Oregon, southwestern Idaho, Arizona and western Utah hosts 19 geothermal power plants in Nevada that produce more than 486 MW. The largest plant is the McGinnis Hills facility operated by Ormat with a capacity of 96MW. Other geothermal plants in Nevada are at Steamboat Springs, Brady/Desert Peak, Dixie Valley, Soda Lake, Stillwater and Beowawe.

Reliability

Unlike power sources such as wind and solar, geothermal energy is dispatchable, meaning that it is both available whenever needed, and can quickly adjust output to match demand. According to the US Energy Information Administration (EIA), of all types of new electrical generation plants, geothermal generators have the highest capacity factor, a measure of how much power a facility actually generates as a percent of its maximum capacity. The EIA rates new geothermal plants as having a 92% capacity factor, comparable to those of nuclear (90%), and higher than gas (87%), or coal (85%), and much higher than those of intermittent sources such as onshore wind (34%) or solar photovoltaic (25%). While the carrier medium for geothermal electricity (water) must be properly managed, the source of geothermal energy, the Earth's heat, will be available, for most intents and purposes, indefinitely.

National Geothermal Data System 
The US operates the National Geothermal Data System (NGDS). Through the NGDS, many older paper archives and drill logs stored at state geological surveys are now being digitized and made available for free to the public.

Cost

Environmental effects
The underground hot water and steam used to generate geothermal power may contain chemical pollutants, such as hydrogen sulfide.

 is toxic in high concentrations, and is sometimes found in geothermal systems. Newer production methods separate the hot steam collected underground from the steam used to power turbines, and substantially reduce the risk of releasing contaminants.

The water mixed with the steam contains dissolved salts that can damage pipes and harm aquatic ecosystems. Some subsurface water associated with geothermal sources contains high concentrations of toxic elements such as boron, lead, and arsenic.

Injection of water in enhanced geothermal systems may induce seismicity. Earthquakes at the Geysers geothermal field in California, the largest being Richter magnitude 4.6, have been linked to injected water.

"Possible effects include scenery spoliation, drying out of hot springs, soil erosion, noise pollution, and chemical pollution of the atmosphere and of surface- and groundwaters."

See also
 
Aquaculture
Biofuel in the United States
Geothermal desalination
Geothermal Energy Association
Geothermal Resources Council
Hydroelectric power in the United States
List of renewable energy topics by country
Renewable energy in the United States
Solar power in the United States
Wind power in the United States

References

External links
GA Mansoori, N Enayati, LB Agyarko (2016), Energy: Sources, Utilization, Legislation, Sustainability, Illinois as Model State, World Sci. Pub. Co., 
Geothermal Energy Association
Geothermal Resources Council
Geothermal Lease Auction Signals New Trend in US
The Status of the US Geothermal Industry
Scaling Geothermal for Reliable Baseload Power
Technological Innovation Driving Renewed Interest in Geothermal Energy
Interior Department To Open 190 Million Acres to Geothermal Power
Raser Ready to Deliver Power from Thermo Plant
A History of Geothermal Energy in the United States
Geothermal energy prospect in the United States
Hawaii Groundwater & Geothermal Resources Center by the University of Hawaii at Manoa
The Geothermal Collection by UH Manoa
M 5.0 - 8km NW of The Geysers, California – United States Geological Survey